Alice-Mary Higgins (born 10 April 1975) is an Irish Independent politician who has served as a Senator for the National University since April 2016. She became the leader of the Civil Engagement group in the 25th Seanad. She was the campaigns and policy officer at the National Women's Council of Ireland, and a board member of the European Women's Lobby.

Early life
She is the daughter of Michael D. Higgins, a former Labour Party politician and the ninth and current President of Ireland.

Higgins studied English and philosophy at University College Dublin, and took an MPhil in theatre and cultural studies at Trinity College Dublin, and a Fulbright MA in sociology at The New School in New York City.

Career
Higgins stood for election to Seanad Éireann on the National University panel in April 2016 and was elected to the third and final seat on the 28th count. Higgins is the first woman elected to the NUI Panel in 35 years.

She was an independent candidate for the Dublin constituency at the 2019 European Parliament election but was not elected.

Higgins currently serves as a member of the executive committee of the European Parliamentary Forum for Sexual and Reproductive Rights, campaigning for gender equality, reproductive rights and equal access to healthcare for women.

In 2016, Higgins introduced a motion to the Seanad calling on the Irish Government not to sign up to provisional application of the Comprehensive and Economic Trade Agreement (CETA), citing the investor court system elements of the treaty's potential impacts on public services, the environment and policy decisions 

Higgins currently serves on the Joint Oireachtas Committee on Climate Action, the Joint Oireachtas Committee on Finance, Public Expenditure and Reform, and Taoiseach and the Joint Oireachtas Committee on Disability Matters.

In December 2020, journalist Miriam Lord named Higgins 'Senator of the Year' "for her tireless approach, collegial outlook, level of research, grasp of detail, participation in debates and undimmed enthusiasm for the job."

In the 25th Seanad Higgins served on the Joint Oireachtas Committee on Climate Action and the Join Oireachtas Committee on Employment Affairs and Social Protection.

In 2021, Higgins introduced a motion to support the TRIPS Waiver on the COVID-19 vaccine, which was passed in the Seanad.

References

1975 births
Living people
Alumni of Trinity College Dublin
Alumni of University College Dublin
Children of presidents of Ireland
Alice-Mary
Members of the 25th Seanad
Politicians from County Galway
Members of Seanad Éireann for the National University of Ireland
Independent members of Seanad Éireann
The New School alumni
Members of the 26th Seanad
21st-century women members of Seanad Éireann